Lev Ivanovich Zhirkov (19 March 1885, Moscow – 4 December 1963, Moscow) was a Soviet and Russian philologist, specializing in Persian and Caucasian languages, and Esperantist.

References

1885 births
1963 deaths
20th-century philologists
Writers from Moscow
Recipients of the Order of the Red Banner of Labour
Linguists from the Soviet Union
Linguists of Iranian languages
Russian Esperantists
Soviet philologists